Bácskai Újság (lit. Bacskan News) was a Hungarian language daily political newspaper. It was founded in 1935, with the purpose of serving as the information source for the population of Hungarian part of Bácska. It was published in Baja in Hungary. Its chief-in-editor was Károly Ruszthi. Bácskai Újság was disestablished in 1942.

See also
 Bácskai Újság (1899)
 Bácskai Friss Újság
 Hungarians in Vojvodina

References

External links
(Hungarian) Kosztolányi Dezső emlékoldal - Bácskai lapok.1 Sajtótörténeti háttér a Forrásjegyzék 2. kötetéhez
(Hungarian) Születésnapi Újság, születésnapi újságok, régi újság minta ajándék ...
(Hungarian) Szabadka városfejlődése 1700 és 1910 között
(Hungarian) LÉTÜNK  - TÁRSADALOM, TUDOMÁNY, KULTÚRA, 2002.1-2

1935 establishments in Hungary
1942 disestablishments in Hungary
Defunct newspapers published in Hungary
Hungarian-language newspapers
Mass media in Baja, Hungary
Daily newspapers published in Hungary
Newspapers established in 1935
Publications disestablished in 1942